Texas Car Wars is an American reality documentary television series on the Discovery Channel. The series debuted on September 9, 2012 and follows four auto body shops who participate in bidding wars in order to find the most valuable junk cars and refurbish them into jackpots.

Episodes

References

2010s American reality television series
2012 American television series debuts
English-language television shows
Discovery Channel original programming
Television shows set in Texas
2012 American television series endings